The 194th (Edmonton Highlanders) Battalion, CEF, was a unit in the Canadian Expeditionary Force during the First World War.  Based in Edmonton, Alberta, the unit began recruiting during the winter of 1915/16 in that city and surrounding district.  After sailing to England in November 1916, the battalion was absorbed into the 9th Reserve Battalion on January 21, 1917.  The 194th (Edmonton Highlanders) Battalion, CEF, had one officer commanding: Lieutenant-Colonel W. C. Craig.

In 1929, the battalion was awarded the theatre of war honour .

The king's and regimental colours of the 194th Battalion are laid up in the rotunda of the Alberta Legislature Building in Edmonton.

References
 

Battalions of the Canadian Expeditionary Force
Military units and formations of Alberta
Organizations based in Edmonton